Shan-Tung (also: Shan-tung, Shantung, Shan Tung; 山东/山東; Shandong) is a province of China

Shan Tung, Shan-tung, Shantung, or, variant, may also refer to:

Places
 Shantung Peninsula, Shan-Tung Province, China; a peninsula separating the Yellow Sea fromt the East China Sea, at the Straits of Bohai
 Shan-tung Promontory or Cape Shan-tung, Shantung Peninsula, China
 Shan Tung Street, Mong Kok, Kowloon, Hong Kong
 Apostolic Vicariate of Shantung, Shan-Tung, China; in the Roman Catholic Church

Facilities and structures
 Shantung Railway, Shan-Tung, China
 Shantung Road Hospital, Pudong, Shanghai, China

People
 Yau Shan-Tung, an actor in the traveling production of Flower Drum Song
 Anglican Bishop of Shantung, Shan-Tung, China

Fictional characters
 Shan Tung, a character from the 1920 silent U.S. western film The River's End (film)
 Shantung Cat, a character from the 1994 Hong Kong film Tian Di
 Han Shan-tung, a character from The Gatekeepers (aka The Power of Five) by Anthony Horowitz; see List of The Power of Five characters
 Sorcerer-Prince Shan-Tung, a character from the French fantasy comic La Quête de l'oiseau du temps
 Shan-Tung, a character from the Agatha Christie Hercule Poirot story The Labours of Hercules

Military
 Battle of Shantung (1904), on the sea off Shantung Promontory in the Russo-Japanese War
 Shantung Treaty (1922), Washington Naval Conference (WNC); a treaty associated with the Nine-Power Treaty
 Shantung Incident (1927), Jinan, Shan-Tung, China; between Nationalist Chinese and Japanese
 Shantung Column, predecessor of the 73rd Group Army

Other uses
 Shantung maple (Acer truncatum), a tree found in northern China
 Shantung (fabric), a type of silk fabric from Shandong Province, China

 SS Shantung, a Swedish cargo ship; see List of shipwrecks in December 1941

See also

 Shantung Christian University, Jinan, Shantung, China
 
 
 
 Tung Shan (disambiguation)
 Tung (disambiguation)
 Shan (disambiguation)
 Shandong (disambiguation)